The 2017 World Match Racing Tour was a series of match racing sailing regattas staged during 2017 season.

Torvar Mirsky won the finals and became 2017 World Champions.

Regattas

Standings

References

2017
2016 in sailing
2017 in sailing